"We Rode In Trucks" is  a song co-written and recorded by American country music artist Luke Bryan. It was released in October 2007 as the second single from his debut album I'll Stay Me. Bryan co-wrote this song with Roger Murrah and Jim McCormick.

Content
In the first verse, the narrator describes where he lived as a young man, and the activities he engaged in, such as picking cotton and pig wrestling. The woman he is addressing also lived on a farm, and "rode in trucks." In the second verse, he describes things she learned at that age, such as kissing and fighting. The speaker then imagines driving down a back road in his truck. In the third and final verse, the narrator describes new changes in his life. Bryan told Billboard the song is a "tribute to growing up in rural America."

Critical reception
Matt C. of Engine 145 gave the song a "thumbs up" rating, describing the song as the "finest example of a nostalgic song" that he has heard since Alan Jackson’s "Remember When." He goes on to say that the song contains many lines with "elegant simplicity and are delivered with evocative sincerity." Kevin John Coyne of Country Universe gave the song a B grade, calling it a nostalgic song but a similar theme "has been covered this year with greater effect by Miranda Lambert and Rodney Atkins."

Music video
The video shows Bryan singing the song at a swamp in Georgia. It was directed by Shaun Silva and premiered in late 2007.

Chart performance
The song debuted on the Billboard Hot Country Songs chart at number 60 for the week of November 3, 2007. It peaked at number 33 on that chart in February 2008, becoming Bryan's lowest-peaking single to date. It would also be his only single to miss the top 10 until fourteen years later, when "Up" peaked at number 21 in 2022.

Certifications

References

2007 singles
2000s ballads
Luke Bryan songs
Songs written by Luke Bryan
Songs written by Jim McCormick (songwriter)
Songs written by Roger Murrah
Music videos directed by Shaun Silva
Country ballads
Capitol Records Nashville singles
2007 songs